"The Summer Megamix" is a 1989 single by German band Boney M. The single peaked at #11 in the French charts  and #3 in Norway. In the UK, the single barely reached the top 100, peaking only at #92. The megamix is a medley of remixed Boney M. hits, "Sunny", "Hooray! Hooray! It's a Holi-Holiday", "Kalimba de Luna", "Ma Baker" and "El Lute".

Releases
7"
 "The Summer Mega Mix" (Radio Version) - 4:28 / "The Calendar Song" (Remix) - 2:20 (Hansa Records 112 466-100, 1989)

12"
 "The Summer Mega Mix" (Extended Version) - 7:25 / "The Calendar Song" (Remix) - 2:20 / "The Summer Mega Mix" (Radio Version) - 4:28 (Hansa 612 466-213, 1989)

CD
 "The Summer Mega Mix" (Radio Version) - 4:28 / "The Calendar Song" (Remix) - 2:20 (Hansa 162 466-203, 1989)
 "The Summer Mega Mix" (Extended Version) - 7:25 / "The Calendar Song" (Remix) - 2:20 / "The Summer Mega Mix" (Radio Version) - 4:28 (Hansa 662 466-211, 1989)

Sources
http://www.hitparade.ch/showitem.asp?key=266371&cat=s

1989 songs
Boney M. songs